Elettariopsis was a genus of plants in the ginger family, that has now been subsumed into the genus Amomum.  Species are native to Southeast Asia, southern China and New Guinea.

Species previously placed here
 Elettariopsis burttiana Y.K.Kam - Perak
 Elettariopsis chayaniana Yupparach - Thailand
 Elettariopsis curtisii Baker in J.D.Hooker - Thailand, Malaysia, Borneo
 Elettariopsis elan C.K.Lim - Thailand, Malaysia
 Elettariopsis exserta (Scort.) Baker in J.D.Hooker - Thailand, Malaysia
 Elettariopsis kandariensis (K.Schum.) Loes. in H.G.A.Engler - Sulawesi
 Elettariopsis kerbyi R.M.Sm. - Sarawak
 Elettariopsis latiflora Ridl. - Malaysia
 Elettariopsis limiana Picheans. & Yupparach - Thailand
 Elettariopsis monophylla (Gagnep.) Loes. in H.G.A.Engler - Laos, Thailand, Hainan
 Elettariopsis poonsakiana Picheans. & Yupparach - Thailand
 Elettariopsis procurrens (Gagnep.) Loes. in H.G.A.Engler - New Guinea
 Elettariopsis puberula Ridl. - Sumatra
 Elettariopsis ranongensis Picheans. & Yupparach - Thailand
 Elettariopsis rugosa (Y.K.Kam) C.K.Lim - Selangor
 Elettariopsis slahmong C.K.Lim - Thailand, Malaysia
 Elettariopsis smithiae Y.K.Kam - Thailand, Malaysia
 Elettariopsis stenosiphon (K.Schum.) B.L.Burtt & R.M.Sm.  - Sarawak
 Elettariopsis sumatrana Valeton - Sumatra
 Elettariopsis triloba (Gagnep.) Loes. in H.G.A.Engler - Laos, Thailand, Vietnam
 Elettariopsis unifolia (Gagnep.) M.F.Newman - Vietnam
 Elettariopsis wandokthong Picheans. & Yupparach - Thailand

References

Alpinioideae
Zingiberaceae genera